Ivan Padělek (born December 10, 1974) is a Czech former professional ice hockey right winger.

Padělek played in the Czech Extraliga for HC Dukla Jihlava, HC Vsetín, HC Vítkovice, HC Oceláři Třinec, HC Kometa Brno and HC Plzeň. He also played seventeen games for Amur Khabarovsk of the Russian Superleague during the 2006–07 season.

His younger brother Aleš Padělek is also a professional ice hockey player and the two were teammates whilst at Dukla Jihlava and Vítkovice.

References

External links

1974 births
Living people
Amur Khabarovsk players
Czech ice hockey right wingers
HC Dukla Jihlava players
SHK Hodonín players
HC Kometa Brno players
HC Oceláři Třinec players
HC Plzeň players
HC Slezan Opava players
Sportspeople from Jihlava
HC Tábor players
HC Vítkovice players
VHK Vsetín players
Czech expatriate ice hockey players in Russia